Sophia High School is a private school in Bangalore, India. The middle and high schools are girls only, while the primary school is co-educational.

History
Sophia High School is located on a  land in central Bangalore overlooking the Vidhan Soudha and Bangalore golf course.

In August 1948, when the Internuncio and the Apostolic Delegation shifted to New Delhi, his residence and grounds in the heart of Bangalore was then taken over by a group of Catholic sisters of the Society of the Sacred Heart, RSCJ. In January 1949, three pioneers of the order,  Mother Catherine Andersson, Mother Ivy Bourke and Sister Dorothy Bullen opened a school called the "Convent of the Sacred Heart" in the only residential building on the grounds, the old "white bungalow". A Montessori class with 17 students and one qualified teacher was established. About 40% of the students admitted were not Indian nationals. In 1957 the school's name was changed to "Sophia High School" after St Madeline Sophie Barat, a founder of the Society of the Sacred Heart.

In 1972 the Society of the Sacred Heart reviewed their strategy in India, and handed off several local schools, including Sophia High School, to other Catholic groups, in order to focus on schools that needed funding and attention, especially in India's rural areas. Sophia High School was taken over by the School Sisters of Notre Dame.

Since then the school has grown significantly. The school's current enrollment is over 2,000 students. The school is not a religious organization and its students, who are chosen through a competitive interview process, are from many different ethnicities. The founding "white bungalow" still stands on campus and was remodeled in 1998.

The Times of India has called it one of Bangalore's "legendary" schools with "a historic past", 
and one of the city's "top schools" which, before the 1990s, "had identities that went beyond their names".

Academics
Sophia High School prepares students for the 10th grade national ICSE examinations. The school also prepares students for the 12th grade national ISC examination conducted by the Council for ISC Examination, New Delhi. The medium of instruction is English.

The ICSE (Class 10) program in the school offers subjects including English, Science (Physics, Chemistry and Biology), Mathematics, Hindi, Kannada, French, History and Civics, Geography Environmental Studies and Economic Applications, Computer Applications, Physical Education and Art as an elective.

The ISC (Class 12) program in the school offers three streams, namely Science, Commerce and Humanities. In the Science stream, the students must take English, Physics and Mathematics and can choose 2 other subjects from Psychology, Chemistry, Economics, Biology, Computer Science and Elective English. In the Commerce stream, the students must take English, Commerce and Accounts and can choose 2 other subjects from Psychology, Economics, Computer Science and Elective English. In the Humanities stream, the students must take English, Political Science and History and can choose 2 other subjects from Psychology, Economics, Computer Science and Elective English.

Individual girls from the school performed in the top few students in Bangalore in ICSE and ISC examinations in 2018 and 2019.

The Sophia Opportunity School
Sophia's Opportunity School branch educates disabled children. This branch also undertakes social action outreach programs, such as work with a street children's home in Chamrajpet, interaction with the women inmates of Bangalore's Central Jail, a day in rural schools in the Bangalore metro and visits to aged and orphan homes in the area.

This part of the school was originally founded in 1972 for children with learning disabilities. Where possible, children attending the Opportunity School are mainstreamed back into the main school.

Buildings
There are five main buildings;  Julie (pre-primary), Barat(primary), Civilly (middle school), Mater (eighth standard), Deschene (high school) and the ISC block (+2). The Civilly building houses an auditorium.

Principals

Current principals:
 Sister Mary Alpana (from 2014),
 Sister Anjana (Primary)
 Sister Madhuja (Opportunity)

Former principals:
 Sister Mary Priscilla (from 2010)
 Sister Mary Sandhya
 Sister Mary Aneeta (Primary)
 Sister Roselyn

Concerts

The school has held concerts to raise funds for the school or for charity.

 The King and I, 2002.
 Joseph And The Amazing Technicolour Dreamcoat, 2006, to raise funds for the construction of the Auditorium block of the school.
 Musical version of the Disney movie, Mulan, 2010, to raise money to build a school in rural Karnataka.
 Concert, The Alternative Snow White, 2013 to help fund the reconstruction of the Master building.
 Musical based on Hairspray, 2017.

The house system
Activities and competitions within the school are conducted in Houses. These are named after the founder members of the school, with Julie House changed from Deschene House after the Notre Dame Sisters took over from the Sacred Heart sisters.

 Andersson - Yellow House
 Barat - Red House
 Bennett - Lavender/Purple House
 Julie - Green House

The Sophia High School Brass Band
The Sophia High School Brass Band includes 100-150 students from grade 7 to grade 12. The Brass Ensemble represents the School in various inter-school competitions.

Charity work
The school helps teach the residents of the Angel orphanage, with students of the +2 section volunteering to help teach them after the normal working school hours. The school supports organizations like Help Age India, Global Cancer Concern India, and the Smile foundation. The school concert, a production of Mulan, was held to raise money to build a school in a rural area of Andhra Pradesh.

Notable alumni

 Justice B.V. Nagarathna, Judge, Supreme Court of India
 Dr Pratima Murthy, Director, NIMHANS, Bangalore

Athletes
 Nisha Millet, Olympic swimmer
 Shikha Tandon, Olympic swimmer
 Khushi Dinesh, swimmer
 Jayawanti Shyam, basketball
 Sagarika Dayum, basketball
 Varsha Sanjeev, Snooker, billiards

Models and actors
 Deepika Padukone, actor and producer
 Kirtana Kumar, actor, director, film-maker and writer
 Vaishali Desai, model and actor
 Nicole Faria, actor, model and beauty pageant winner
 Roshmitha Harimurthy, model and beauty pageant winner
 Sharmiela Mandre, actor and producer
 Neha Shetty, actor
 Roopal Tyagi, choreographer and actor

See also
 List of schools in Bangalore

External links
 School history
 Sophia High School

References

School Sisters of Notre Dame schools
Christian schools in Karnataka
Girls' schools in Karnataka
High schools and secondary schools in Bangalore
Private schools in Bangalore
Educational institutions established in 1949
1949 establishments in India